{{Infobox film
| name           = Fjorton suger("Fourteen Sucks")
| image          = 
| alt            = 
| caption        = 
| director       = Emil LarssonHenrik NorrthonMartin JernFilippa Freijd
| producer       = Ralf IvarssonPeter PossneFilippa FreijdMartin JernEmil LarssonHenrik Norrthon
| writer         = Martin Jern
| screenplay     = 
| story          = 
| narrator       = 
| starring       = Elin AhlbergJesper FridhAndreas KaroliussenBjörn Månsson
| music          = Filippa FreijdMartin JernEmil LarssonHenrik Norrthon
| cinematography = 
| editing        = 
| studio         = 
| distributor    = Sonet Film
| released       = 
| runtime        = 82 minutes
| country        = Sweden
| language       = Swedish
| budget         = 
| gross          = 
}}Fjorton suger' (English: "Fourteen Sucks") is a Swedish film which was released to cinemas in Sweden on 29 October 2004, directed by Emil Larsson, Henrik Norrthon and others, about a teenage girl and her family.

Plot
Emma is fourteen years old and lives with her parents and her older brother, Marcus, in a terrace house in Scania. She has many friends, but the contact between her and Marcus is not so good because he mostly thinks she is a tough and persistent little sister. The film is set during Emma's summer vacation. Emma and her friends are heading to a party at the home of one of Marcus' friends. Marcus is angry that Emma is at the party, and he thinks she does not belong there. He chooses not to go to the party because he does not want to party with his little sister. At the party, Emma becomes too drunk, falls asleep in a bed upstairs, and then one of Marcus' closest friends rapes her. Later, she falls in love with the skater Aron, but behaves strangely at times against him because of what happened at the party. After a period of several incidents, Marcus finally understands what his friend did to his little sister.

Cast
Elin Ahlberg as Emma
Jesper Fridh as Markus
Andreas Karoliussen as Aron
Björn Månsson as Patrik
Catherine Jeppsson as Emma's mom
Jörgen Düberg as Emma's Dad
Emily Nilsson as Lina
Thea Klitte as Karin
Thomas Hesslow as Per
Simon Lindell as Andy
David Sjöland as Daniel
Sara Herrlander as Julia
Otto Blücker as Kricka
Jacob Walfridsson as Jacob
Johan Billgren as Johan

Production
The film was shot in Hittarp, Skåne County, Sweden, in July–August 2003.

Reception
The Swedish newspaper Aftonbladet'' rated the film as 3/5.

References

External links

Swedish drama films
2004 films
2000s Swedish films